The music score for Alfred Hitchcock's 1958 film Vertigo was composed by Bernard Herrmann between 3 January and 19 February 1958. The recordings were made in London and Vienna, with orchestra conducted by Muir Mathieson. A musicians' strike had prevented the score from being recorded in Los Angeles with Herrmann conducting.

What follows is a list of the music cues that appear in the film and where (or if) they can be found on the various releases of the original soundtrack recordings and significant re-recordings of the score.

Breakdown of music cues
Bernard Herrmann's score for Vertigo consists of 42 cues, which comprise about 74 minutes of music heard in the film. (The small bits of source music used in the film, such as the Mozart piece heard on Midge's phonograph or the music Scottie and Judy dance to late in the film, were not composed by Herrmann and are therefore not considered as part of the score.) Note that Herrmann spelled the Kim Novak character's name as Madeline, not Madeleine.

In the following table, the length of the cues in the actual film are given. The letters afterward represent which CD release the cue can be found on, if applicable. [A] is the original version of the soundtrack recording; [B] the McNeely re-recording; and [C] the expanded re-release of the original soundtrack. [D] would be the Conlon re-recording, but as this recording contains all cues below, it was deemed unnecessary to be included in the list.

1958 original soundtrack LP
The original soundtrack LP on Mercury Records contained 34 minutes of the music score. It included most of the major musical cues from the film but represented less than half of the complete score. The album was released on CD in 1990 as Mercury 422 106-2.

1995 McNeely re-recording
In 1995, Varèse Sarabande released a new recording of the Vertigo score with Joel McNeely conducting the Royal Scottish National Orchestra. This recording boasted much better sound quality over the then 37-year-old original soundtrack recording, and it included almost twice as much of the score.

1996 expanded original soundtrack re-release
Research conducted during the two-year-long restoration of Vertigo by Robert A. Harris and James C. Katz uncovered the original master recordings of the music score at Paramount Pictures. These stereo masters were used in the new 5.1 mix of the film, as well as a much expanded CD of the original soundtrack recording.

This CD is 64 minutes long (with the selection of cues closely matching that of the McNeely recording). Unfortunately, the tapes had not been stored under the best of conditions, and deficiencies can be heard in some spots. The CD liner notes state that the music track for the cue "The Graveyard" was too damaged to be included. For the 5.1 mix, the film restoration team was forced to lift the audio for the sequence from a music and effects reel located in Spain. However, 13 other (mostly minor) cues in the film are missing from the expanded soundtrack CD without explanation. Several can be cleanly extracted from the 5.1 mix of the film, indicating that the music tracks for some of these cues survive and were used for the new mix.

(Note that some parts of the CD are in stereo, and other parts are in mono. This is due to the London cues being recorded in stereo and the Vienna cues in mono.)

1999 Conlon re-recording
This recording, with James Conlon conducting the Paris Opera Orchestra, is the only recording to date to feature the entire Bernard Herrmann score for Vertigo. All 42 cues are included, though the CD presents them as one long 74½ minute track. This CD is not as accessible as the previous two, as it was not released on its own. It was included with the now out-of-print Douglas Gordon book, Feature Film.

References
 Mulhall, Kevin, Herrmann's Liebestod, liner notes to Varèse Sarabande CD (VSD-5759).
 Vertigo at SoundtrackCollector - The Movie Soundtrack Database

Further reading
 Cooper, David. Bernard Herrmann's Vertigo: A Film Score Handbook. Film score guides, no. 2. Westport, CT: Greenwood Press, 2001. ISBNs: 031331490X, 9780313314902. (Note: Page 78 of Cooper's book was misprinted. He has made the corrected page available here.)
 Kosovsky, Robert. "Book Review: Bernard Herrmann's Vertigo: A Film Score Handbook." Notes: Quarterly Journal of the Music Library Association 59, no. 1 (2002): 69-71. E-. Print .
 Gordon, Douglas, Bernard Herrmann, James Conlon, Raymond Bellour, and Royal, S. Brown. Feature Film: A Book. London: Book Works, 2000. ISBNs: 1870699238, 9781870699235, 1902201051, 9781902201054.

External links
 Vertigo at Film Score Rundowns - Cue-by-cue analysis of the score.
 Vertigo at Film Music Review - Film in Focus.

Film scores
Thriller film soundtracks
1958 soundtrack albums
Mercury Records soundtracks
Varèse Sarabande soundtracks
Bernard Herrmann albums
1995 soundtrack albums
1996 soundtrack albums
1999 soundtrack albums